
Osmond Gilles (24 August 1788 – 25 September 1866) was a settler, pastoralist, mine owner and the Colony of South Australia’s first colonial treasurer.

Born in London of Huguenot descent, in 1816 he went into partnership with Philip Oakden in Hamburg, Germany as a merchant, where in 1825 he married Patience Oakden, Philip's sister. They returned to England, where his wife died in 1833. They had no children, and Gilles never remarried, but took on several protegees, including his nephew John Jackson Oakden.

He was a prominent businessman and land owner, with the largest holdings of any settler in 1837. He was, with his secretary William Finke, and a few others, the fortunate ticket-holder in the ballot for the purchase of city acres at Glenelg, of which he took full advantage. He sat on the Street Naming Committee on 23 May 1837.

Named for Gilles
Gilles Street in the Adelaide Central Business District
Gilles Arcade, off Currie Street, site of the Queen's Theatre
Glen Osmond Road
O.G. Hotel, Gilles Plains, founded 1843 and still operating
O.G. Road, a major thoroughfare through the suburb of Klemzig adjacent and much later than the O.G. Hotel
O.G., a cutter built in Glenelg 1840
Osmond Terrace, a major thoroughfare through the suburbs of Norwood and Fullarton. (Osmond Road, Marion was named for Harry Osmond, a local businessman.) 
Adelaide suburbs of Glen Osmond and Gilles Plains. A new suburb formed from a portion of Gilles Plains has been named Oakden after Gilles' wife.
Gilleston Park on the Gilles Plains and farmed by Dr. John Blunden,
Gilleston, now part of Balhannah
Lake Gilles which is located in the north of Eyre Peninsula was named after Gilles by the British explorer, Edward John Eyre, in 1839.

See also
 French Australians
 French British

References

Citations

Sources
 Osmond Gilles at the Australian Dictionary of Biography

Settlers of South Australia
1788 births
1866 deaths
Public servants of South Australia
English emigrants to colonial Australia
Treasurers of South Australia
19th-century Australian politicians